John Harold Lozano Prado (born 30 March 1972) is a Colombian retired footballer who played mainly as a defensive midfielder.

He spent most of his 13-year professional career in Spain, amassing La Liga totals of 134 matches and five goals, almost all with Real Valladolid (six seasons).

Club career
Lozano was born in Cali. During his career he played for América de Cali, Sociedade Esportiva Palmeiras (Brazil), Club América (Mexico), Real Valladolid and RCD Mallorca (Spain), retiring in 2004 after a stint with C.F. Pachuca (Mexico). Whilst at Mallorca, he helped them win the 2003 edition of the Copa del Rey.

While at the service of Valladolid, during a 29 September 2001 away match against Real Madrid which finished 2–2, opposing players blamed Lozano for whistling during a free kick, causing them to believe that the referee had blown the whistle and with the visitors profiting from the situation to score. He denied responsibility, saying it could have been any of the 90,000 spectators attending the game.

International career
Lozano won 48 caps for Colombia over a ten-year span, and was a participant at the 1994 and at 1998 FIFA World Cups. He also represented the nation in three editions of the Copa América: 1993, 1995 and 1999.

References

External links

Futpédia profile 

1972 births
Living people
Colombian people of African descent
Colombian people of Spanish descent
Footballers from Cali
Colombian footballers
Association football midfielders
Categoría Primera A players
América de Cali footballers
Campeonato Brasileiro Série A players
Sociedade Esportiva Palmeiras players
Liga MX players
Club América footballers
C.F. Pachuca players
La Liga players
Real Valladolid players
RCD Mallorca players
Colombia international footballers
1994 FIFA World Cup players
1998 FIFA World Cup players
1993 Copa América players
1995 Copa América players
1999 Copa América players
2003 CONCACAF Gold Cup players
Footballers at the 1992 Summer Olympics
Olympic footballers of Colombia
Colombian expatriate footballers
Expatriate footballers in Brazil
Expatriate footballers in Mexico
Expatriate footballers in Spain
Colombian expatriate sportspeople in Brazil
Colombian expatriate sportspeople in Mexico
Colombian expatriate sportspeople in Spain